Humanistic psychology is a psychological perspective that arose in the mid-20th century in answer to two theories: Sigmund Freud's psychoanalytic theory and B. F. Skinner's behaviorism. Thus, Abraham Maslow established the need for a "third force" in psychology. The school of thought of humanistic psychology gained traction due to key figure Abraham Maslow in the 1950s during the time of the humanistic movement. It was made popular in the 1950s by the process of realizing and expressing one's own capabilities and creativity.

Humanistic psychology aims to help the client gain the belief that all people are inherently good. It adopts a holistic approach to human existence and pays special attention to such phenomena as creativity, free will, and positive human potential. It encourages viewing ourselves as a "whole person" greater than the sum of our parts and encourages self exploration rather than the study of behavior in other people. Humanistic psychology acknowledges spiritual aspiration as an integral part of the psyche. It is linked to the emerging field of transpersonal psychology.

Primarily, this type of therapy encourages a self-awareness and reflexivity that helps the client change their state of mind 
and behaviour from one set of reactions to a healthier one with more productive self-awareness and thoughtful actions. Essentially, this approach allows the merging of mindfulness and behavioral therapy, with positive social support.

In an article from the Association for Humanistic Psychology, the benefits of humanistic therapy are described as having a "crucial opportunity to lead our troubled culture back to its own healthy path. More than any other therapy, Humanistic-Existential therapy models democracy. It imposes ideologies of others upon the client less than other therapeutic practices. Freedom to choose is maximized. We validate our clients' human potential."

In the 20th century, humanistic psychology was referred to as the  "third force" in psychology, distinct from earlier, less humanistic approaches of psychoanalysis and behaviorism.

Its principal professional organizations in the US are the Association for Humanistic Psychology and the Society for Humanistic Psychology (Division 32 of the American Psychological Association). In Britain, there is the UK Association for Humanistic Psychology Practitioners.

Differences with psychoanalytic theory and behaviorism 
To understand the key message of Maslow's humanistic theory (the basis of humanistic psychology) it is important to understand how Maslow first came to that theory. Through disagreement with the predominant theories at the time, developed by Freud and Skinner, Maslow was able to formulate the main points of humanistic theory.

Maslow had the following criticisms of the two main theories at the time:

a. Maslow felt that Freud's theory was deterministic, meaning that it attributed the behavior of people to unconscious desires.

b. Maslow felt that Freud and Skinner's theories focused on individuals with mental conflicts (pathological) rather than all individuals.

c. Maslow felt that the other two theories focused too much on the negative traits of human beings rather than focusing on the positive power he believed individuals to have.

In contrast, when Maslow developed his theory he decided to focus on the conscious (rather than the unconscious) and decided to develop a theory to explain how all individuals could reach their highest potential.

Origins
One of humanistic psychology's early sources was the work of Carl Rogers, who was strongly influenced by Otto Rank, who broke with Freud in the mid-1920s.  Rogers' focus was to ensure that the developmental processes led to healthier, if not more creative, personality functioning. The term 'actualizing tendency' was also coined by Rogers, and was a concept that eventually led Abraham Maslow to study self-actualization as one of the needs of humans. Rogers and Maslow introduced this positive, humanistic psychology in response to what they viewed as the overly pessimistic view of psychoanalysis.

The other sources of inspiration include the philosophies of existentialism and phenomenology.

Conceptual origins 

Whilst origins of humanistic psychology date back to the early 1960s, the origins of humanism date back to the classical civilizations of China, Greece, and Rome, whose values were renewed in the European Renaissance.
The modern humanistic approach has its roots in phenomenological and existentialist thought (see Kierkegaard, Nietzsche, Heidegger, Merleau-Ponty and Sartre). Eastern philosophy and psychology also play a central role in humanistic psychology, as well as Judeo-Christian philosophies of personalism, as each shares similar concerns about the nature of human existence and consciousness.
For further information on influential figures in personalism, see: Emmanuel Mounier, Gabriel Marcel, Denis de Rougemont, Jacques Maritain, Martin Buber, Emmanuel Levinas, Max Scheler and Karol Wojtyla.

As behaviorism grew out of Ivan Pavlov's work with the conditioned reflex, and laid the foundations for academic psychology in the United States associated with the names of John B. Watson and B. F. Skinner; Abraham Maslow gave behaviorism the name "the first force", a force which systematically excluded the subjective data of consciousness and much information bearing on the complexity of the human personality and its development. Behavioral theory continued to develop to both account for simple and complex human behavior through theorists such as Arthur Staats, Stephen Hayes, and other post-Skinnerian researchers.  Clinical behavioral analysis continues to be widely employed in anxiety disorder treatments, mood disorders, and even personality disorders.

The "second force" arose out of Freudian psychoanalysis, which were composed by psychologists like Alfred Adler, Erik Erikson, Carl Jung, Erich Fromm, Karen Horney, Melanie Klein, Harry Stack Sullivan, and Sigmund Freud himself. Maslow then emphasized the necessity of a "third force" (even though he didn't use the term), saying that "it is as if Freud supplied us the sick half of psychology and we must now fill it out with the healthy half", as a critical review towards the cold and distant approach of the psychoanalysis and its deterministic way of viewing the human being.

In the late 1930s, psychologists, interested in the uniquely human issues, such as the self, self-actualization, health, hope, love, creativity, nature, being, becoming, individuality, and meaning—that is, a concrete understanding of human existence—included Abraham Maslow, Carl Rogers, and Clark Moustakas, who were interested in founding a professional association dedicated to a psychology focused on these features of human capital demanded by post-industrial society.

The humanistic psychology perspective is summarized by five core principles or postulates of humanistic psychology first articulated in an article written by James Bugental in 1964 and adapted by Tom Greening, psychologist and long-time editor of the Journal of Humanistic Psychology. The five basic principles of humanistic psychology are:

 Human beings, as human, supersede the sum of their parts. They cannot be reduced to components.
 Human beings have their existence in a uniquely human context, as well as in a cosmic ecology.
 Human beings are aware and are aware of being aware—i.e., they are conscious. Human consciousness always includes an awareness of oneself in the context of other people.
 Human beings have the ability to make choices and therefore have responsibility.
 Human beings are intentional, aim at goals, are aware that they cause future events, and seek meaning, value, and creativity.

While humanistic psychology is a specific division within the American Psychological Association (Division 32), humanistic psychology is not so much a discipline within psychology as a perspective on the human condition that informs psychological research and practice.

Practical origins 

WWII created practical pressures on military psychologists, they had more patients to see and care for than time or resources permitted.  The origins of group therapy are here.   Eric Berne's progression of books shows this transition out of what we might call pragmatic psychology of WWII into his later innovation, Transactional Analysis, one of the most influential forms of humanistic Popular Psychology of the later 1960s-1970. Even though transactional analysis was considered a unique methodology, it was challenged after Berne's death.

Orientation to scientific research 

Humanistic psychologists generally do not believe that we will understand human consciousness and behavior through mainstream scientific research. The objection that humanistic psychologists have to traditional research methods is that they are derived from and suited for the physical sciences and not especially appropriate to studying the complexities and nuances of human meaning-making.

However, humanistic psychology has involved scientific research of human behavior since its inception. For example:
 Abraham Maslow proposed many of his theories of human growth in the form of testable hypotheses, and he encouraged scientists to put them to the test.
 Shortly after the founding of the American Association of Humanistic Psychology, its president, psychologist Sidney Jourard, began his column by declaring that "research" is a priority. "Humanistic Psychology will be best served if it is undergirded with research that seeks to throw light on the qualities of man that are uniquely human" (emphasis added)
 In May 1966, the AAHP release a newsletter editorial that confirmed the humanistic psychologist's "allegiance to meaningfulness in the selection of problems for study and of research procedures, and an opposition to a primary emphasis on objectivity at the expense of significance."  This underscored the importance of research to humanistic psychologists as well as their interest in special forms of human science investigation.
 Likewise, in 1980, the American Psychological Association's publication for humanistic psychology (Division 32 of APA) ran an article titled, What makes research humanistic? As Donald Polkinghorne notes, "Humanistic theory does not propose that human action is completely independent of the environment or the mechanical and organic orders of the body, but it does suggest that, within the limits of experienced meanings, persons as unities can choose to act in ways not determined by prior events...and this is the theory we seek to test through our research" (p. 3).

A human science view is not opposed to quantitative methods, but, following Edmund Husserl:
 favors letting the methods be derived from the subject matter and not uncritically adopting the methods of natural science, and
 advocates for methodological pluralism. Consequently, much of the subject matter of psychology lends itself to qualitative approaches (e.g. the lived experience of grief), and quantitative methods are mainly appropriate when something can be counted without leveling the phenomena (e.g. the length of time spent crying).

Research has remained part of the humanistic psychology agenda, though with more of a holistic than reductionistic focus. Specific humanistic research methods evolved in the decades following the formation of the humanistic psychology movement.

Development of the field

Saybrook Conference 
In November 1964 key figures in the movement gathered at Old Saybrook (CT) for the first invitational conference on Humanistic psychology. The meeting was a co-operation between the Association for Humanistic Psychology (AHP), which sponsored the conference, the Hazen Foundation, which provided financing, and Wesleyan University, which hosted the meeting. In addition to the founding figures of Humanistic psychology; Abraham Maslow, Rollo May, James Bugental and Carl Rogers, the meeting attracted several academic profiles from the humanistic disciplines, including: Gordon Allport, George Kelly, Clark Moustakas, Gardner Murphy, Henry Murray, Robert W. White, Charlotte Bühler, Floyd Matson, Jacques Barzun, and René Dubos. Robert Knapp was chairman and Henry Murray gave the keynote address.

Among the intentions of the participants was to formulate a new vision for psychology that, in their view, took into consideration a more complete image of the person than the image presented by the current trends of Behaviorism and Freudian psychology. According to Aanstoos, Serlin & Greening the participants took issue with the positivistic trend in mainstream psychology at the time. The conference has been described as a historic event that was important for the academic status of Humanistic psychology and its future aspirations.

Major theorists 
Several key theorists have been considered to have prepared the ground for humanistic psychology. These theorists include Otto Rank, Abraham Maslow, Carl Rogers and Rollo May. This section provides a short-handed summary of what each individual's contributions for the theory.

Abraham Maslow: In regards to humanistic theory, Maslow developed a hierarchy of needs. This is a pyramid which basically states that individuals first must have their physiological needs met, then safety, then love, then self-esteem and lastly self-actualization. People who have met their self-actualization needs are self-aware, caring, wise and their interests are problem centered. He theorized that self-actualizing people are continuously striving, thinking broadly and focusing on broader problems. He also believed however, that only 1% of people actually achieved self-actualization.

Carl Rogers: Rogers built upon Maslow's theory and argued that the process of self-actualization is nurtured in a growth promoting climate. Two conditions are required in order for a climate to be a self-actualizing growth promoting climate: the individual must be able to be their genuine self, and as the individual expresses their true self, they must be accepted by others.

Counseling and therapy

The aim of humanistic therapy is usually to help the client develop a stronger and healthier sense of self, also called self-actualization.  Humanistic therapy attempts to teach clients that they have potential for self-fulfillment. This type of therapy is insight-based, meaning that the therapist attempts to provide the client with insights about their inner conflicts.

Approaches
Humanistic psychology includes several approaches to counseling and therapy. Among the earliest approaches we find the developmental theory of Abraham Maslow, emphasizing a hierarchy of needs and motivations; the existential psychology of Rollo May acknowledging human choice and the tragic aspects of human existence; and the person-centered or client-centered therapy of Carl Rogers, which is centered on the client's capacity for self-direction and understanding of his or her own development. Client-centered therapy is non-directive; the therapist listens to the client without judgement, allowing the client to come to insights by themselves.  The therapist should ensure that all of the client's feelings are being considered and that the therapist has a firm grasp on the concerns of the client while ensuring that there is an air of acceptance and warmth.   Client-centered therapist engages in active listening during therapy sessions.

A therapist cannot be completely non-directive; however, a nonjudgmental, accepting environment that provides unconditional positive regard will encourage feelings of acceptance and value.

Existential psychotherapies, an application of humanistic psychology, applies existential philosophy, which emphasizes the idea that humans have the freedom to make sense of their lives. They are free to define themselves and do whatever it is they want to do. This is a type of humanistic therapy that forces the client to explore the meaning of their life, as well as its purpose. There is a conflict between having freedoms and having limitations. Examples of limitations include genetics, culture, and many other factors. Existential therapy involves trying to resolve this conflict.

Another approach to humanistic counseling and therapy is Gestalt therapy, which puts a focus on the here and now, especially as an opportunity to look past any preconceived notions and focus on how the present is affected by the past. Role playing also plays a large role in Gestalt therapy and allows for a true expression of feelings that may not have been shared in other circumstances. In Gestalt therapy, non-verbal cues are an important indicator of how the client may actually be feeling, despite the feelings expressed.

Also part of the range of humanistic psychotherapy are concepts from depth therapy, holistic health, encounter groups, sensitivity training, marital and family therapies, body work, the existential psychotherapy of Medard Boss, and positive psychology.

Empathy and self-help
Empathy is one of the most important features of humanistic therapy. This idea focuses on the therapist's ability to see the world through the eyes of the client. Without this, therapists can be forced to apply an external frame of reference where the therapist is no longer understanding the actions and thoughts of the client as the client would, but strictly as a therapist which defeats the purpose of humanistic therapy. Included in empathizing, unconditional positive regard is one of the key elements of humanistic psychology. Unconditional positive regard refers to the care that the therapist needs to have for the client. This ensures that the therapist does not become the authority figure in the relationship allowing for a more open flow of information as well as a kinder relationship between the two. A therapist practicing humanistic therapy needs to show a willingness to listen and ensure the comfort of the patient where genuine feelings may be shared but are not forced upon someone. Marshall Rosenberg, one of Carl Rogers' students, emphasizes empathy in the relationship in his concept of Nonviolent Communication.

Self-help is also part of humanistic psychology: Sheila Ernst and Lucy Goodison have described using some of the main humanistic approaches in self-help groups.  Humanistic Psychology is applicable to self-help because it is oriented towards changing the way a person thinks.  One can only improve once they decide to change their ways of thinking about themselves, once they decide to help themselves. Co-counselling, which is an approach based purely on self-help, is regarded as coming from humanistic psychology as well. Humanistic theory has had a strong influence on other forms of popular therapy, including Harvey Jackins' Re-evaluation Counselling and the work of Carl Rogers, including his student Eugene Gendlin; (see Focusing) as well as on the development of the Humanistic Psychodrama by Hans-Werner Gessmann since the 80s.

Ideal and real selves
The ideal self and real self involve understanding the issues that arise from having an idea of what you wish you were as a person, and having that not match with who you actually are as a person (incongruence). The ideal self is what a person believes should be done, as well as what their core values are. The real self is what is actually played out in life. Through humanistic therapy, an understanding of the present allows clients to add positive experiences to their real self-concept. The goal is to have the two concepts of self become congruent. Rogers believed that only when a therapist was able to be congruent, a real relationship occurs in therapy. It is much easier to trust someone who is willing to share feelings openly, even if it may not be what the client always wants; this allows the therapist to foster a strong relationship.

Non-pathological
Humanistic psychology tends to look beyond the medical model of psychology in order to open up a non-pathologizing view of the person. This usually implies that the therapist downplays the pathological aspects of a person's life in favour of the healthy aspects. Humanistic psychology tries to be a science of human experience, focusing on the actual lived experience of persons.  Therefore, a key ingredient is the actual meeting of therapist and client and the possibilities for dialogue to ensue between them. The role of the therapist is to create an environment where the client can freely express any thoughts or feelings; he does not suggest topics for conversation nor does he guide the conversation in any way. The therapist also does not analyze or interpret the client's behavior or any information the client shares. The role of the therapist is to provide empathy and to listen attentively to the client.

Societal applications

Social change

While personal transformation may be the primary focus of most humanistic psychologists, many also investigate pressing social, cultural, and gender issues. In an academic anthology from 2018, British psychologist Richard House and his co-editors wrote, "From its very outset, Humanistic Psychology has engaged fulsomely and fearlessly with the social, cultural and political, in a way that much of mainstream scientific, 'positivistic' psychology has sought to avoid".
Some of the earliest writers who were associated with and inspired by psychological humanism explored socio-political topics.  For example:
 
 Alfred Adler argued that achieving a sense of community feeling is essential to human development.
 Medard Boss defined health as an openness to the world, and unhealth as anything in the psyche or society that blocked or constricted that openness.
 Erich Fromm argued that the totalitarian impulse is rooted in people's fear of the uncertainties and responsibilities of freedom – and that the way to overcome that fear is to dare to live life fully and compassionately.
 R. D. Laing analyzed the political nature of "normal", everyday experience.
 Rollo May said that people have lost their values in the modern world, and that their health and humanity depends on having the courage to forge new values appropriate to the challenges of the present.
 Wilhelm Reich argued that psychological problems are often caused by sexual repression, and that the latter is influenced by social and political conditions – which can and should be changed.
 Carl Rogers came to believe that political life did not have to consist of an endless series of winner-take-all battles, that it could and should consist of an ongoing dialogue among all parties.  If such dialogue were characterized by respect among the parties and authentic speaking by each party, compassionate understanding and – ultimately – mutually acceptable solutions could be reached.
 Virginia Satir was convinced that her approach to family therapy would enable individuals to expand their consciousness, become less fearful, and bring communities, cultures, and nations together.

Relevant work was not confined to these pioneer thinkers.  In 1978, members of the Association for Humanistic Psychology (AHP) embarked on a three-year effort to explore how the principles of humanistic psychology could be used to further the process of positive social and political change.  The effort included a "12-Hour Political Party", held in San Francisco in 1980, where nearly 1,400 attendees discussed presentations by such non-traditional social thinkers as Ecotopia author Ernest Callenbach, Aquarian Conspiracy author Marilyn Ferguson, Person/Planet author Theodore Roszak, and New Age Politics author Mark Satin.  The emergent perspective was summarized in a manifesto by AHP President George Leonard.  It proffered such ideas as moving to a slow-growth or no-growth economy, decentralizing and "deprofessionalizing" society, and teaching social and emotional competencies in order to provide a foundation for more humane public policies and a healthier culture.

There have been many other attempts to articulate humanistic-psychology-oriented approaches to social change. For example, in 1979 psychologist Kenneth Lux and economist Mark A. Lutz called for a new economics based on humanistic psychology rather than utilitarianism.  Also in 1979, California state legislator John Vasconcellos published a book calling for the integration of liberal politics and humanistic-psychological insight.  From 1979 to 1983 the New World Alliance, a U.S. political organization based in Washington, D.C., attempted to inject humanistic-psychology ideas into political thinking and processes; sponsors of its newsletter included Vasconcellos and Carl Rogers.

In 1989 Maureen O'Hara, who had worked with both Carl Rogers and Paulo Freire, pointed to a convergence between the two thinkers.  According to O'Hara, both focus on developing critical consciousness of situations which oppress and dehumanize.  Throughout the 1980s and 1990s, Institute of Noetic Sciences president Willis Harman argued that significant social change cannot occur without significant consciousness change.  In the 21st century, influenced by humanistic psychology, people such as Edmund Bourne, Joanna Macy, and Marshall Rosenberg continued to apply psychological insights to social and political issues.

In addition to its uses in thinking about social change, humanistic psychology is considered to be the main theoretical and methodological source of humanistic social work.

Social work
After psychotherapy, social work is the most important beneficiary of the humanistic psychology's theory and methodology.  These theories have produced a deep reform of the modern social work practice and theory, leading, among others, to the occurrence of a particular theory and methodology: Humanistic Social Work. Most values and principles of the humanistic social work practice, described by Malcolm Payne in his book Humanistic Social Work: Core Principles in Practice, directly originate from the humanistic psychological theory and humanistic psychotherapy practice, namely creativity in human life and practice, developing self and spirituality, developing security and resilience, accountability, flexibility and complexity in human life and practice.

Also, the representation and approach of the client (as human being) and social issue (as human issue) in social work is made from the humanistic psychology position. According to Petru Stefaroi, the way humanistic representation and approach of the client and their personality is realized is, in fact, the theoretical-axiological and methodological foundation of humanistic social work.

In setting goals and the intervention activities, in order to solve social/human problems, there prevail critical terms and categories of the humanistic psychology and psychotherapy, such as: self-actualization, human potential, holistic approach, human being, free will, subjectivity, human experience, self-determination/development, spirituality, creativity, positive thinking, client-centered and context-centered approach/intervention, empathy, personal growth, empowerment. Humanistic psychology has been utilised as a framework for theorizing the African philosophy of Ubuntu in social work practice. In addition, humanistic social work calls for the pursuit of social justice, holistic service provision, technological innovation and stewardship, dialogue and cooperation as well as professional care and peer support during the COVID-19 pandemic.

Creativity in corporations
Humanistic psychology's emphasis on creativity and wholeness created a foundation for new approaches towards human capital in the workplace stressing creativity and the relevance of emotional interactions. Previously the connotations of "creativity" were reserved for and primarily restricted to, working artists. In the 1980s, with increasing numbers of people working in the cognitive-cultural economy, creativity came to be seen as a useful commodity and competitive edge for international brands.  This led to corporate creativity training in-service trainings for employees, led pre-eminently by Ned Herrmann at G.E. in the late 1970s.

Concepts of humanistic psychology were embraced in education and social work, peaking in the 1970s-1980s in North America. However, as with the whole language theory, training practices were too superficial in most institutional settings.  Though humanistic psychology raised the bar of insight and understanding of the whole person, professionally it is primarily practiced today by individual licensed counselors and therapists. Outside of those fields humanistic psychology provides the foundation for virtually every method of Energy Medicine; but little coherence exists yet in this field to discuss it easily.

See also

References

Further reading
Arnold, Kyle. (2014).  Behind the Mirror:  Reflective Listening and its Tain in the Work of Carl Rogers.  The Humanistic Psychologist, 42:4 354-369.
 Bendeck Sotillos, S. (Ed.). (2013). Psychology and the Perennial Philosophy: Studies in Comparative Religion. Bloomington, IN: World Wisdom. .
 Bugental, J. F. T. (Ed.). (1967). Challenges of humanistic psychology. New York, NY: McGraw-Hill.
 Bugental, J.F.T (1964). "The Third Force in Psychology". Journal of Humanistic Psychology 4 (1): 19–25. .
 Buhler, C., & Allen, M. (1972). Introduction to humanistic psychology. Monterey CA: Brooks/Cole Pub. Co.
 Chiang, H. -M., & Maslow, A. H. (1977). The healthy personality (Second ed.). New York, NY: D. Van Nostrand Co.
 DeCarvalho, R. J. (1991). The founders of humanistic psychology. New York, NY: Praeger Publishers.
 Frick, W. B. (1989). Humanistic psychology: Conversations with Abraham Maslow, Gardner Murphy, Carl Rogers. Bristol, IN: Wyndham Hall Press. (Original work published 1971)
 Fromm, E. (1955). The sane society. Oxford, England: Rinehart & Co.* Fromm, E. (1955). The sane society. Oxford, England: Rinehart & Co.
 Gessmann, H.-W. (2012). Humanistic Psychology and Humanistic Psychodrama. - Гуманистическая психология и гуманистическая психодрама. Москва - jurpsy.ru/lib/books/id/25808.php
Gunn, Jacqueline Simon;  Arnold, Kyle; Freeman, Erica. (2015). The Dynamic Self Searching for Growth and Authenticity:  Karen Horney's Contribution to Humanistic Psychology.  The Forum of the American Academy of Psychoanalysis and Dynamic Psychiatry, 59: 2 20-23.
 Human Potentialities: The Challenge and the Promise. (1968). Human potentialities: The challenge and the promise. St. Louis, MO: WH Green.

 Kress, Oliver (1993). "A new approach to cognitive development: ontogenesis and the process of initiation". Evolution and Cognition 2(4): 319-332.
 Maddi, S. R., & Costa, P. T. (1972). Humanism in personology: Allport, Maslow, and Murray. Chicago, IL: Aldine·Atherton.
 Misiak, H., & Sexton, V. S. J. A. (1973). Phenomenological, existential, and humanistic psychologies: A historical survey. New York, NY: Grune & Stratton.
 Moss, D. (1999). Humanistic and transpersonal psychology: A historical and biographical sourcebook. Westport, CT: Greenwood Press.
 Moustakas, C. E. (1956). The self: Explorations in personal growth. Harper & Row.
 Murphy, G. (1958). Human potentialities. New York, NY: Basic Books.
 Nevill, D. D. (1977). Humanistic psychology: New frontiers. New York, NY: Gardner Press .
 Otto, H. A. (1968). Human potentialities: The challenge and the promise. St. Louis, MO: WH Green.
 Rogers, CR, Lyon, HC Jr, Tausch, R: (2013) On Becoming an Effective Teacher - Person-centered teaching, psychology, philosophy, and dialogues with Carl R. Rogers and Harold Lyon. London: Routledge 
 Rowan, John (2001). Ordinary Ecstasy: The Dialectics of Humanistic Psychology (3rd ed.). Brunner-Routledge. 

 Schneider, K., Bugental, J. F. T., & Pierson, J. F. (2001). The handbook of humanistic psychology: Leading edges in theory, research, and practice. London: SAGE.
 Schneider, K.J., ed (2008). Existential-integrative Psychotherapy: Guideposts to the Core of Practice. New York: Routledge. 
 Severin, F. T. (1973). Discovering man in psychology: A humanistic approach. New York, NY: McGraw-Hill.
 Singh, J. (1979). The humanistic view of man. New Delhi, India: Indian Institute of Public Administration.
 Sutich, A. J., & Vich, M. A. (Eds.). (1969). Readings in humanistic psychology. New York, NY: Free Press.
 Welch, I., Tate, G., & Richards, F. (Eds.). (1978). Humanistic psychology: A source book. Buffalo, NY: Prometheus Books.
 Zucker, R. A., Rabin, A. I., Aronoff, j., & Frank, S. (Eds.). (1992). Personality structure in the life course. New York, NY: Springer.

External links
 What Is Humanistic Psychology?
 Association for Humanistic Psychology
 Society for Humanistic Psychology, Division 32 of the American Psychological Association
 University of West Georgia's Humanistic Psychology Program
 All about Humanistic Psychology 

 
Existential therapy